Élie Léo Wollman (July 4, 1917 – June 1, 2008) was a French microbial geneticist who first described plasmids (what he termed "episomes"), and served as vice director of research for the Pasteur Institute for twenty years. He was awarded the 1976 Grand Prix Charles-Leopold Mayer by the French Academy of Sciences and Chevalier of the French Legion of Honour.

Research 
 In his lab at the Pasteur Institute in Paris Wollman played a key role in the elucidation of the organization of genetic material.
 Developed the experimental method of interrupted mating, which underpinned the gene mapping of bacterial chromosomes. This work laid the foundation for Francois Jacob's Nobel prize-winning work.
 With Francois Jacob, he published a monograph, Sexuality and the genetics of bacteria (French title: La sexualité des bactéries), in 1959.

Selected publications

References

External links 

 Robert Dantzer and Keith W. Kelley, "Elie Wollman", Biographical Memoirs of the National Academy of Sciences (2009)

1917 births
2008 deaths
Foreign associates of the National Academy of Sciences
French geneticists
Members of the Académie Française
French molecular biologists
Phage workers
Chevaliers of the Légion d'honneur
Members of the French Academy of Sciences